Renewed Communist Party of Armenia (in Armenian: Hayastani Noratsvats Komunistakan Kusaktsutyun) was a political party in Armenia. HNKK was formed on May 25, 2002, by former Armenian Communist Party (HKK) leaders Yuri Manukian and Grant Voskanyan who had been expelled from HKK the previous year on the grounds that they had advocated cooperation with the government. Manukian became the First Secretary of the Central Committee of the party.

HNKK published Khosq Bazmatc.

HNKK supported Robert Kocharyan in the 2003 presidential elections.

In the May 2003 parliamentary elections HNKK launched 40 candidates. The party got 6200 votes (0.53%). The electoral slogan of the party was "Motherland. Work. Socialism.".

On July 7 the same year, HNKK merged into the United Communist Party of Armenia.

List of candidates in the 2003 parliamentary election
 Manukyan Yura
 Voskanyan Hrant
 Melik-Ohanjanyan Yuri
 Hayrapetyan Volodya
 Gevorgyan Nelli
 Mazmanyan Levon
 Baroyan Vladimir
 Stepanyan Herbert
 Sahakyan Hayk
 Razgoeva Svetlana
 Hovhannisyan Samvel
 Tovmasyan Eduard
 Mikoyan Artavazd
 Kharbutyan Galust
 Khachatryan Gagik
 Hovsepyan Armen
 Chagharyan Samvel
 Papyan Levon
 Gevorgyan Andranik
 Hambardzumyan Arshak
 Hovakimyan Irina
 Mkrtchyan Ruben
 Chakhalyan Arsen
 Stepanyan Minas
 Ohanjanyan Razmik
 Amiryan Ashot
 Petrosyan Lyova
 Sahakyan Seryoja
 Movsisyan Sergey
 Manukyan Jora
 Ghazaryan Arman
 Hakobyan Tsoghik
 Harutyunyan Henrik
 Lalayan Kamo
 Israyelyan Rima
 Jajoyan Senjik
 Kharatyan Tamara
 Ajamoghyan Vrej
 Alexsanyan Karen
 Avagyan Vladik

See also

Politics of Armenia
Programs of political parties in Armenia

Communist parties in Armenia
Defunct political parties in Armenia